The Republic of Texas presidential election of 1844 was the fourth and last presidential election. It was held on September 2, 1844. The contest was held between Anson Jones and Edward Burleson, the vice president of the Republic of Texas. Jones defeated Burleson by a margin of 1,376 votes to become the fourth and final President of Texas.

On February 26, 1845, five months after the election, the Republic of Texas was annexed by the United States and was admitted as the 28th state on December 29 of that year.

See also
1845 Texas gubernatorial election, the first gubernatorial election in the State of Texas

1844 elections in North America
presidential election, 1844
Non-partisan elections
1844